Real estate settlement companies work with the lenders and real estate agents of both the buyer and seller in order to facilitate the terms of a real estate contract.

There can be confusion between real estate settlement companies and mortgage originators. A customer would contact a bank (lender) for a mortgage, and would contact a real estate settlement company to handle the closing of the mortgage.

Real estate in the United States